Franz Kafka's Diaries, written in German language between 1910-1923, include casual observations, details of daily life, reflections on philosophical ideas, accounts of dreams, and ideas for stories. Kafka’s diaries offer a detailed view of the writer's thoughts and feelings, as well as some of his most famous and quotable statements.

Kafka began keeping the diaries at the age of 27, as an attempt to provoke his stalled creativity, and kept writing in them until 1923, a year before his death. These diaries were in the background all through the composition of Kafka's major works and many of them are discussed and analyzed in detail. 

The diaries offer an image of a profoundly depressed man, isolated from friends and family, involved in a series of failed relationships, and constantly sick. While this is certainly part of Kafka's character, it is typical for a private journal, not meant for publication, to express more of the writer's anxieties and worries. The humor and light-heartedness sometimes expressed in Kafka's fiction, as well as the generally positive image arising from recollections by friends and acquaintances, are missing from the diaries.

Initially published by Schocken Books in two volumes, The Diaries of Franz Kafka 1910-1913 and The Diaries of Franz Kafka 1914-1923, they were brought together in a single volume in 1964.

References
Kafka, Franz. Diaries 1910-1923. New York City: Schocken Books, 1988.

External links
 Translated excerpts from 1910 - 1923
 kafka.org – The Kafka Project, started in 1998 with the purpose of publishing online all Kafka texts in German

Books by Franz Kafka
Books published posthumously
Diaries
1988 non-fiction books
Schocken Books books
de:Franz Kafka